Apertochrysa flavinotala is a species of green lacewing.

See also
 Apertochrysa arcuata
 Apertochrysa pilinota

References

Chrysopidae
Insects described in 2004